The Sentinelese are an indigenous people of North Sentinel Island in the Andaman Islands.

Sentinelese may also refer to:
Sentinelese language, the assumed language of the Sentinelese
Relating to Sentinel Island (disambiguation)